Melvin Oliva Jerusalem (born 22 February 1994) is a Filipino professional boxer who has held the WBO mini-flyweight title since January 2023 and challenged for the WBC mini-flyweight title in 2017.

Professional career

Early career

First title challenge
Jerusalem, ranked #9 in the WBC strawweight rankings, faced off against champion Wanheng Menayothin on January 25, 2017. Menayothin won by a closely contested unanimous decision. Jerusalem was deducted a point in the eight round for a low blow; the bout would have finished in a majority draw otherwise.

After suffering the first loss of his professional career, Jerusalem was scheduled to face Joey Canoy on the undercard of the "Pinoy Pride 41" event on July 8, 2017. He lost the fight by unanimous decision, with scores of 95–93, 95–93 and 96–92. Jerusalem was knocked down in the seventh round and was deducted a point in the eight round for repeated low blows. Jerusalem faced Jestoni Racoma at Pinoy Pride 43 on November 25, 2017. He successfully rebounded from his first professional losses by beating Racoma by unanimous decision, with scores of 78–74, 80–72, 80–82.

Jerusalem was scheduled to face Philip Luis Cuerdo on June 9, 2018, at Pinoy Pride 44. He won the fight by an eight-round technical knockout. Jerusalem was scheduled to face Toto Landero on November 10, 2018. He won the fight by unanimous decision with one judge scoring the fight 97–93 for him, while the remaining two judges awarded him a 98–92 scorecard.

Jerusalem's sole fight of 2019 was against Reymark Taday on August 17, 2019. He won the fight by a seventh-round stoppage, as Taday chose to retire from the fight at the end of the round. Jerusalem fought only once in 2020 as well, against Jayson Francisco, whom he beat by a second-round knockout.

OPBF strawweight champion
Jerusalem was booked to fight Toto Landero for the vacant OPBF strawweight title on July 16, 2021, at the Tabunoc Sports Complex in Talisay, Philippines. He won the rematch by unanimous decision, with judges scoring the fight 118–110 in his favor, while the third judge scored it 116–112 for Jerusalem. Jerusalem was next scheduled to face the journeyman Ramel Antaran in a stay-busy non-title bout on 26 February 2022. He won the fight by unanimous decision. Two judges scored the bout 79–73 in his favor, while the third judge scored the fight 77–75 for Jerusalem.

WBO mini-flyweight champion

Jerusalem vs. Taniguchi
Jerusalem challenged the reigning WBO mini-flyweight champion Masataka Taniguchi in the main event of "3150 FIGHT vol.4", which took place at the Osaka Prefectural Gymnasium in Osaka, Japan on January 6, 2023 and was broadcast by Abema TV. After losing the opening round 10–9 on two of the judges' scorecards, Jerusalem won the fight by a second-round technical knockout. He knocked Taniguchi down with a one-two combination near the first minute of the round, which left the champion unable to recover sufficiently enough to beat the ten count.

Jerusalem vs. Collazo
On January 30, 2023, Jerusalem was ordered by the WBO to make his first title defense against the unbeaten mandatory challenger Oscar Collazo. The two camps failed to reach a deal within the allotted 30-day negotiation period and a purse bid was called for February 23, which was later declared deserted by the WBO, as representatives of the two fighters failed to comply with the purse bid terms. The purse bid was rescheduled for February 27 and won by Golden Boy Promotions and Cotto Promotions, who submitted a bid of $152,000.

Professional boxing record

See also
List of world mini-flyweight boxing champions
List of Filipino boxing world champions

References

External links

1994 births
Living people
Mini-flyweight boxers
Light-flyweight boxers
Filipino male boxers
Sportspeople from Bukidnon
People from Bukidnon
World mini-flyweight boxing champions
World Boxing Organization champions